Ronald Volkman (born 4 July 2002) is an Australian rugby league footballer who plays as a  for the New Zealand Warriors in the NRL.

Background
Volkman was born in Sydney, New South Wales, Australia. He went to Waverley College. He is of Samoan & German descent.

Playing career
A Bankstown Bulls junior, Volkman signed with the Sydney Roosters in 2021. Volkman also played in the NSW Cup for the North Sydney Bears. In May 2022, he was released mid season by the Roosters and signed with the New Zealand Warriors on a three year deal. Volkman made his first grade debut in round 15 of the 2022 NRL season in his side's 40−6 loss to the Penrith Panthers at Dolphin Stadium.

References

External links
New Zealand Warriors profile

2002 births
Living people
Australian sportspeople of Samoan descent
Australian rugby league players
New Zealand Warriors players
Rugby league five-eighths
Rugby league players from Sydney